Adi Ophir (born September 22, 1951) is an Israeli philosopher.

Early life 
Adi Ophir was born on September 22, 1951. He received his BA and MA from the Hebrew University of Jerusalem and his PhD from Boston University.

Ophir is married to Ariella Azoulay.

Career 
Ophir teaches philosophy at the Cohn Institute for the History and Philosophy of Science and Ideas at Tel Aviv University. He is also a fellow at the Van Leer Jerusalem Institute where he directs an interdisciplinary research project on "Humanitarian Action in Catastrophes: The Shaping of Contemporary Political Imagination and Moral Sensibilities."

Works
 Plato's Invisible Cities: Discourse and Power in the "Republic" (1990). Routledge. 
 "The Identity of the Victims and the Victims of Identity: A Critique of Zionist Ideology for a Post-Zionist Age." (2000) In Laurence Jay Silberstein (ed.), Mapping Jewish Identities (pp. 174–200). NYU Press. .
 The Order of Evils: Toward an Ontology of Morals (2005). MIT Press. Translated by Rela Mezali and Havi Carel. 
 (ed. with Michal Givoni and Sari Hanafi) The power of inclusive exclusion: anatomy of Israeli rule in the occupied Palestinian territories, Zone Books, 2009. 
 (with Ariella Azoulay) The One-State Condition. Stanford University Press, 2012.
 אלימות אלוהית : שני חיבורים על אלוהים ואסון [Divine Violence: Two Essays on God and Disaster]. The Van Leer Institute, 2013.
 (ed. with J. M. Bernstein and Ann Laura Stoler) Political Concepts: A Critical Lexicon. Fordham University Press, 2017. * (with Ishay Rosen-Zvi) Goy: Israel's Multiple Others and the Birth of the Gentile. Oxford University Press, 2018. 
 In the Beginning Was the State: Divine Violence in the Hebrew Bible. Fordham University Press, 2023.

References

External links
Audio interview with Adi Ophir and Ariella Azoulay regarding their book "This Regime Which is not One – Occupation and Democracy Between the Sea and the River (1967 - )" from the Alternative Information Center
Moran Peled, Three generations and postmodernism, Moran Peled speaks with Adi Ophir about his views on postmodernism, Eretz Acheret Magazine

Israeli philosophers
1951 births
Jewish philosophers
Jewish Israeli writers
Continental philosophers
20th-century Israeli philosophers
Hebrew University of Jerusalem alumni
Academic staff of Tel Aviv University
Living people
Brown University faculty
Boston University alumni